The Zagime Anishinabek (formerly known as the Sakimay First Nation) are a Saulteaux band government in southern Saskatchewan, Canada. Their reserves include:
 Little Bone 74B
 Minoahchak 74C
 Sakimay 74-1
 Sakimay 74-2
 Sakimay 74-3
 Sakimay 74-4
 Sakimay 74-5
 Sakimay 74-6
 Sakimay 74-7
 Sakimay 74-9
 Sakimay 74-10
 Sakimay 74-11
 Sakimay 74-12
 Sakimay 74-14
 Sakimay 74-16
 Sakimay 74-17
 Shesheep 74A
 Treaty Four Reserve Grounds 77, shared with 32 other bands.

Chief and council

Chief: Chief Bonnie Acoose

Councillors:
 Paula Acoose 
 Amber Sangwais 
 Cynthia Sangwais 
 Rachel Sangwais 
 Ruth “Kitty” Whitehat
 Dana Acoose
 Randall Sparvier

References

First Nations in Saskatchewan